The Burnside War Memorial Hospital is the only private community hospital in the City of Burnside, Adelaide, South Australia.

A local resident of Toorak Gardens, Otto George Ludwig von Rieben, offered his Attunga property for use as a community hospital free of charge in 1944. The council had first suggested building a community hospital in August 1943 as part of its Post-War Reconstruction and Development Committee; it was to cost 100,000 pounds and to remain as a memorial to honour Burnside's war dead. In April 1949 the first conversion of von Rieben's home was complete and the hospital was caring for 21 patients. The hospital closed for a month in 1956 and when it reopened was given its present name: The Burnside War Memorial Hospital. By then it had cared for over 1,400 patients.

External links
Burnside War Memorial Hospital

City of Burnside
Hospitals in Adelaide
Hospitals established in 1944